Édith Jéhanne (9 February 1899 – 14 June 1949) was a French film actress of the silent and early sound era.

Filmography
 1922: Rouletabille chez les bohémiens (dir. Henri Fescourt)
 1922: Triplepatte (dir. Raymond Bernard)
 1924: Le Miracle des loups (dir. Raymond Bernard)
 1927: The Chess Player (dir. Raymond Bernard)
 1927: The Love of Jeanne Ney (dir. Georg Wilhelm Pabst)
 1928: Le Perroquet verre (dir. Jean Milva)
 1930: Tarakanova (dir. Raymond Bernard)
 1930: Quand nous étions deux (dir. Léonce Perret)

Notes

References

Bibliography

External links
 
 

1899 births
1949 deaths
Year of death unknown
French film actresses
French silent film actresses
20th-century French actresses
People from Indre